The Thanjavur cannon is one of the largest early modern period cannons located in Thanjavur, Thanjavur district, Tamil Nadu, India.

Location
Thanjavur cannon also known as Rajagopala Beerangi is a massive cannon in Beerangi Medu (The cannon kept on a mount or higher pedestal), Thanjavur, in East Rampart area of the Thanjavur Fort. It is located at the heart of the city and located very near to the Brihadeeswarar Temple. Autos and Buses are available to reach the place where it is kept.

Specialities
It was made of a new technology. The high standard of iron and steel technology in ancient and medieval India is reflected in the manufacture and use of numerous large iron objects. It includes forge-welded cannons as well. Such cannons are found in Mushirabad, Dacca (in Bangladesh), Bijapur, Gulbarga, and Thanjavur. Based on its weight and size, the cannon at Thanjavur, is regarded as one of the largest forge-welded iron cannons in the world.
 It finds fourth place in the list of Largest Cannons fired in the World History. It was named "Rajagopala Beerangi (Cannon), but popularly known as "Daasimettu Beerangi". It is placed on an elevated (25’high) defense barricade at the Eastern Rampart. This cannon was cast in 1620 at Kollumedu. Its metallurgical skills speaks volumes of the people in 17th century. It is said Tamils technical know how was used to cast the cannon. It is said to be one of the biggest in the world. It was mounted in 1620 CE when Raghunatha Nayak ruled Thanjavur.

Composition
The nearly 400 years old cannon, though exposed to sun and rain, have not rusted so far. It is of 26 foot long and is weighing 20 tonnes. It is forge welded and has not been made by casting. Its outer circle is of 300 cm in diameter, while the inner circle is of 150 cm in diameter. Inside, it is made using 43 long iron plates and the outer of 94 iron rings. To lift the cannon eight rings were present on top earlier. Only two rings are found. It can fire a cannonball (iron) of 1000 kg weight.

Operation
This cannon was used in 1650 during the Nayak period to protect Thanjavur from enemies who entered through East Gate of the town. From the site (top) one can see the Sarja madi (seven-floor structure) and the Arsenal tower of Nayak Palace on the western side.

References

Artillery of India
Tourist attractions in Thanjavur
Individual cannons